Manila (also Veto) is an unincorporated community in Dallas County, Alabama, United States.

Notes

Unincorporated communities in Dallas County, Alabama
Unincorporated communities in Alabama